Some Christian theologians embrace a holistic combination of Christian theology with some ideas of (ontological) materialism, a belief that matter is a fundamental substance of the world and that mental phenomena result from matter.

Historical background

Throughout history, Christian thought has struggled with the ideas of flesh, world, and spirit, and their interplay in each person's salvation.  As Cardinal Joseph Ratzinger (Pope Benedict XVI) said in What It Means To Be a Christian (2006), "Christian theology... in the course of time turned the kingdom of God into a kingdom of heaven that is beyond this mortal life; the well-being of men became a salvation of souls, which again comes to pass beyond this life, after death."

This tendency of spiritualization, Ratzinger said, is not the message of Jesus Christ. "For what is sublime in this message," he stated, "is precisely that the Lord was talking not just about another life, not just about men's souls, but was addressing the body, the whole man, in his embodied form, with his involvement in history and society; that he promised the kingdom of God to the man who lives bodily with other men in this history."

Christian materialism is a widely discussed position in contemporary analytic philosophy of religion, defended by figures such as Peter van Inwagen and Trenton Merricks.

Pope John Paul II's Theology of the Body lectures asserted that "The body, and it alone, is capable of making visible ... the spiritual and divine."

Christopher West, in reviewing the words of Pope John Paul II, asserted

Archbishop William Temple has remarked that Christianity is "the most avowedly materialist of all the great religions."

Rejection of 'materialism'
According to Constantin Gutberlet writing in Catholic Encyclopedia (1911), "materialism", defined as "a philosophical system which regards matter as the only reality in the world…denies the existence of God and the soul." In this view, materialism could be perceived incompatible with world religions that ascribe existence to immaterial objects. Materialism may be conflated with atheism; according to Friedrich A. Lange (1892), "Diderot has not always in the Encyclopædia expressed his own individual opinion, but it is just as true that at its commencement he had not yet got as far as Atheism and Materialism."

Mary Baker Eddy, the founder of the Christian Science movement, denied the existence of matter on the basis of the allness of Mind (which she regarded as a synonym for God).

Josemaría Escrivá and Opus Dei

The most visible use of the term is found in the writings of Josemaría Escrivá, a Spanish Catholic saint of the twentieth century, who said that all temporal realities have a sanctifying power and Christians can find God in the most ordinary material things. As such, it is associated with the Roman Catholic prelature of Opus Dei which Escriva founded. It is an organization which teaches that everyone is called to holiness and that ordinary life, even the most material activity, is a path to sanctity.

Escriva criticized those who "have tried to present the Christian way of life as something exclusively spiritual, proper to pure, extraordinary people, who remain aloof from the contemptible things of this world, or at most tolerate them as something necessarily attached to the spirit, while we live on this earth. When things are seen in this way, churches become the setting par excellence of the Christian life. And being a Christian means going to church, taking part in sacred ceremonies, being taken up with ecclesiastical matters, in a kind of segregated world, which is considered to be the ante-chamber of heaven, while the ordinary world follows its own separate path."

Instead, he affirmed the "high value of the material." According to him, "Authentic Christianity which professes the resurrection of all flesh, has always quite logically opposed 'dis-incarnation,' without fear of being judged materialistic. We can, therefore, rightfully speak of a Christian materialism, which is boldly opposed to those materialisms which are blind to the spirit." (Italics and emphasis added) 

In an address to a theological symposium, Holiness and the World, which studied the teachings of Josemaria Escriva, John Paul II referred to one of his homilies:

There is nothing that is outside of the concern of Christ. Speaking with theological rigor ... one  cannot say that there are things — good, noble or even indifferent — which are exclusively profane; for the Word of God has made his dwelling the sons of men, he was hungry and thirsty, worked with his hands, knew friendship and obedience, experienced sorrow and death.

In connection with this quote, John Paul II said that the Catholic Church today is "conscious of serving a redemption that concerns every aspect of human existence," an awareness which was "prepared by a gradual intellectual and spiritual development." He also said that the message of Escriva, which has contributed in this direction, stems "from a unique grasp of the radiant, universal force of the Redeemer's grace." He later called Escriva "one of Christianity's great witnesses."

Relation with "materialistic values"
	
The term "materialistic" is also used pejoratively in the sense of "economic" materialism. 

Rowan Williams, in a lecture to Welsh Centre for International Affairs, asserts that

Prosperity theology which has been criticised as "materialistic".
Prosperity theology in the eyes of Simon Coleman (anthropologist) and Kate Bowler (2013)  is influenced by New Thought. New Thought, to William James, has roots in idealist rather than materialist ontology.

List

Christianity and dialectical materialism 
 Denys Turner, Catholic theologian and Marxist who remarked that the hylomorphism of Thomas Aquinas had materialistic traits and asserted "strong compatibility" between  Marxist materialism and Christian Theism. Unlike many contemporary materialists, he uses 'materialism' to argue for, rather than against, the resurrection and immortality of the body. He is an Opus Dei member himself. 
 Y. T. Wu and much of Sino-Christian theology
 Marxism and religion#Communism and Christianity
 Liberation theology, as claimed by Pope Benedict XVI

 Slavoj Žižek

Ontological-materialist Christian philosophers espousing Mechanism (philosophy) or Mechanical philosophy 
 Thomas Hobbes
 Pierre Gassendi

Non-Nicene writers 
 Joseph Priestley and Dissent

Joseph Smith, the founder of the Latter Day Saint movement, taught: "There is no such thing as immaterial matter. All spirit is matter, but it is more fine or pure, and can only be discerned by purer eyes; We cannot see it; but when our bodies are purified we shall see that it is all matter." This spirit element is believed to always have existed and to be co-eternal with God.
Parley P. Pratt stated that "God, the father is material. Jesus Christ is material. Angels are material. Spirits are material. Men are material. The universe is material ... Nothing exists which is not material."

See also
Christian mortalism
Christoplatonism
 Holism
 Hylotheism
Impanation
 "Incarnational humanism"
William Montgomery Brown
Teleomechanistic idealism (Hermann Lotze)

References

External links
 https://ndpr.nd.edu/reviews/the-monstrosity-of-christ-paradox-or-dialectic/

Materialism
Christian philosophy
Christian anthropology
Opus Dei